WRC 9, also known as WRC 9 FIA World Rally Championship, is the official racing video game of the 2020 World Rally Championship. The game is developed by French developer Kylotonn and published by Nacon. It is available for Microsoft Windows, PlayStation 4, PlayStation 5, Xbox One and Xbox Series X/S, released on 3 September 2020,  with the Nintendo Switch version released on 11 March 2021.

Development and release
In March 2019, WRC 9 was revealed as the official game of the 2020 FIA World Rally Championship alongside WRC 10. It features 14 different locations (reflecting the 2020 season as it was originally intended to be run before the COVID-19 pandemic resulted in many events being rescheduled or cancelled and new rallies added to the calendar), including all three returning rallies, Safari Rally, Rally New Zealand and Rally Japan, with up to fifty official crews from WRC, WRC-2, WRC-3 and J-WRC available for the player to choose. The game also features fifteen more landmark vehicles from the WRC history.

The game was released on PC, PlayStation 4 and Xbox One on 3 September 2020 via Epic Games Store, and later on Nintendo Switch, with a further release date on the ninth generation of video game consoles PlayStation 5 and Xbox Series X/S to be announced.

Reception

Reception for WRC 9 was generally favourable among critics. While troubled by smaller issues, improvements with car handling were noted in many outlets. Among critics, the game was scored at 80% by Push Square. Pixel Bandits rated the title at 4/4, noting the fresh challenge provided to long-time fans of the series.

References

External links 
 

2020 video games
Esports games
Kylotonn games
Multiplayer and single-player video games
Multiplayer online games
Nacon games
Nintendo Switch games
PlayStation 4 games
PlayStation 5 games
Split-screen multiplayer games
Video games developed in France
Video games set in 2020
Video games set in Argentina
Video games set in Australia
Video games set in Finland
Video games set in Germany
Video games set in Italy
Video games set in Japan
Video games set in Kenya
Video games set in Mexico
Video games set in Monaco
Video games set in New Zealand
Video games set in Portugal
Video games set in Sweden
Video games set in Turkey
Video games set in Wales
Windows games
World Rally Championship video games
Xbox One games
Xbox Series X and Series S games